Compsibidion divisum is a species of beetle in the family Cerambycidae. It was described by Brazilian entomologist Ubirajara Martins in 1969.

References

Compsibidion
Beetles described in 1969